MacKay Peak is an ice-covered pyramidal peak rising to 770 m in Friesland Ridge, Tangra Mountains, Livingston Island in the South Shetland Islands, Antarctica.  It is linked by Pleven Saddle to Tervel Peak to the east-northeast, and surmounts Peshtera Glacier to the north and Charity Glacier to the south.

The peak is named after Captain Donald MacKay, Master of the American shallop Sarah who, while seal hunting in the islands in 1820–21, sent home a collection of minerals and rocks to the New York Lyceum of Natural History, forerunner of the American Museum of Natural History.

Location

Maps
 L.L. Ivanov et al. Antarctica: Livingston Island and Greenwich Island, South Shetland Islands. Scale 1:100000 topographic map. Sofia: Antarctic Place-names Commission of Bulgaria, 2005.
 L.L. Ivanov. Antarctica: Livingston Island and Greenwich, Robert, Snow and Smith Islands. Scale 1:120000 topographic map.  Troyan: Manfred Wörner Foundation, 2009.  
 L.L. Ivanov. Antarctica: Livingston Island and Smith Island. Scale 1:100000 topographic map. Manfred Wörner Foundation, 2017.

References
 SCAR Composite Gazetteer of Antarctica.

Tangra Mountains